"How Deep Is Your Love" is the fifth single from the Jamaican recording artist Sean Paul's fifth studio album Tomahawk Technique, featuring American singer Kelly Rowland. It was written by Mikkel S. Eriksen, Jason Henriques, Ester Dean, Sean Paul Henriques and was produced by Stargate. It was released as a digital download in the United States on 24 July 2012. The song has charted in Switzerland and Austria.

Chart performance
On 12 February 2012 the song entered the Swiss Singles Chart at number 72.

Music video
A music video to accompany the release of "How Deep Is Your Love" was first released onto YouTube on 4 October 2012 at a total length of three minutes and twenty-seven seconds.   The music video premiered on BET's 106 & Park on 2 October 2012, when Sean Paul visited the show to premiere the video.

Credits and personnel
Lead vocals – Sean Paul and Kelly Rowland
Producers – Stargate
Lyrics – Mikkel S. Eriksen, Jason Henriques, Ester Dean, Sean Paul Henriques
Label: Atlantic Records

Charts

Release history

References

External links
 Sean Paul – How Deep Is Your Love (feat. Kelly Rowland) [Music Video]

2012 singles
Sean Paul songs
Songs written by Sean Paul
Songs written by Mikkel Storleer Eriksen
Song recordings produced by Stargate (record producers)
Songs written by Ester Dean
2012 songs
Atlantic Records singles